Richard Phare Duncan-Jones, FBA, FSA (born 14 September 1937) is a British historian of the ancient world who specialises in Roman economy and society.

Early life and education
Duncan-Jones is the son of philosopher Austin and playwright and literary scholar Elsie Duncan-Jones; his sister is the Shakespeare scholar Katherine Duncan-Jones. He was educated at King Edward's School, Birmingham, and King's College, Cambridge (BA 1959, MA 1963, PhD 1965).

Career
In 1963, he was elected a fellow of Gonville and Caius College, Cambridge University. He was a college lecturer in classics and is a Life Fellow of the college.

Works
The economy of the Roman Empire (1974)
Structure and scale in the Roman economy (1990)
Money and government in the Roman Empire (1994)
Power and privilege in Roman society (2016)

References 

1937 births
Living people
Fellows of Gonville and Caius College, Cambridge
Fellows of the British Academy
Fellows of the Society of Antiquaries of London